The 1979 Military Friendship Athletics Championships was an international men's outdoor track and field competition between military athletes from states of the Eastern Bloc, including the Soviet Union, East Germany, Poland, Bulgaria, Czechoslovakia, Romania and Cuba. The competition was held in Potsdam, East Germany from 30 August to 1 September.

Poland's Marian Woronin claimed a sprint double in the 100 metres and 200 metres while East Germany's Jürgen Straub did the middle-distance equivalent in the 800 metres and 1500 metres. The most prominent athlete at the competition was the reigning 1976 Olympic hammer throw champion Yuriy Sedykh, who comfortably won his event by several metres. East German Ronald Weigel's win in the 20 kilometres race walk was also a standout performance, as the future world champion finished over two minutes ahead of his rivals.

Results

References

Michał Wróblewski, Ludwik Biegański, Marek Łuczyński, Maciej Petruczenko, Maciej Wawrzykowski: 60 lat PZLA – Rocznik PZLA 1979  (60 years of the Polish Athletic Association – 1979). Polish Athletic Association. Warsaw, 1981.

Military Friendship Athletics Championships
Military Friendship Athletics Championships
International athletics competitions
International athletics competitions hosted by East Germany
Sport in Potsdam
Military sports competitions
Eastern Bloc
20th century in Brandenburg
1979 in East German sport